Prasophyllum crassum is a species of orchid endemic to South Australia. It has a single tube-shaped leaf and up to fifteen greenish and pinkish-brown flowers with a whitish labellum. It is a recently described plant, previously included with P. fitzgeraldii, but distinguished from that species by its smaller number of smaller, less colourful flowers and different labellum shape. It grows in the south-east of the state and usually only appears after fire.

Description
As with others in the genus, the flowers are inverted so that the labellum is above the column rather than below it. The edges of the upturned part are wavy or crinkled with hair-like papillae. There is a raised, claw-like, yellowish brown callus in the centre of the labellum and extending almost to its tip. Flowering occurs in late September and early October.

Taxonomy and naming
Prasophyllum crassum was first formally described in 2017 by David Jones and Robert Bates and the description was published in Australian Orchid Review from a specimen collected in the Desert Camp Conservation Park. The specific epithet (crassum) is a Latin word meaning "thick", "fat" or "stout", referring to the fleshy texture of this orchid.

Distribution and habitat
This leek orchid mostly grows in low lying, winter wet areas in the Big Heath Conservation Park and between Kingston, Mundulla and Frances. It often grows with other species of leek orchid.

References

External links 
 

crassum
Flora of South Australia
Plants described in 2017
Endemic orchids of Australia